Lyricist Lounge: West Coast is the third installment of the Lyricist Lounge series, released in November 2002. This compilation was not released on Rawkus Records like the previous two Lyricist Lounge releases, and was not as successful as the past installments. Unlike the first two Lyricist Lounge albums, which focused mainly on New York City artists, the third album features a line-up of underground West Coast artists, including Zion I, Pep Love, Chino XL, Saafir, Motion Man, Kutmasta Kurt, A-Plus, Mystik Journeymen, Luckyiam, The Grouch, King Tee, Tray Deee, Knoc-turn'al and Rasco.

Track listing
"Let's Make Moves" feat. Furious
"Warrior's Dance" feat. Zion I & Pep Love
"How It Goes" feat. Chino XL & Saafir
"Super Educated, Pt. 2" feat. Arcee & Encore
"Let's Rally" feat. The Grouch
"Ventilation" feat. Groundbasics
"Megalo Maniac" feat. Motion Man & Kutmasta Kurt
"The Buzz" feat. Ammbush, A-Plus & Zion I
"Blackfoot Allstars" feat. Blackfoot
"Plastic Men" feat. Felonious
"Lucky's Back!" Luckyiam
"Nuthin Has Changed" feat. King Tee, Kool G Rap & Tray Deee
"Act Like You Know Me" feat. Shade Sheist, Fabolous & Knoc-turn'al
"Ready 2 Rock w/ Us" feat. Rasco & Kutmasta Kurt
"It's Time" feat. D-Tension & Encore
"Don't Stop" feat. The CUF
"The Biz" feat. Mr. Fab

2002 albums
Lyricist Lounge
Sequel albums